"One in a Million"  is a song by Pete Rock & CL Smooth, recorded for the soundtrack to the film, Poetic Justice. The song contains a mix of jazzy-horns over a sumptuous baseline, with a chorus sung by CL Smooth, and scratches and cuts by Pete Rock. The song contains a sample from Brother Jack McDuff's "Electric SurfBoard".

References

1993 songs
1993 singles
Pete Rock songs
Epic Records singles
Songs written by Pete Rock
Songs written by CL Smooth